A synthetic bond is a synthetic position made up of a mixture of investments designed to mimic the cash flow and risk profile of a corporate bond. A synthetic bond can contain items such as: bond puts, bond calls, bond futures, Treasuries, money market securities, and credit default swaps'.

Bonds (finance)
Derivatives (finance)